Group C of the 2021 CONCACAF Gold Cup took place from 12 to 20 July 2021 in Houston's BBVA Stadium and Orlando's Exploria Stadium. The group consisted of Costa Rica, Guadeloupe, Jamaica, and Suriname.

Teams

Notes

Standings

In the quarter-finals:

The winners of Group C, Costa Rica, advanced to play the runners-up of Group B, Canada.
The runners-up of Group C, Jamaica, advanced to play the winners of Group B, the United States.

Matches

Jamaica vs Suriname

Costa Rica vs Guadeloupe

Guadeloupe vs Jamaica

Suriname vs Costa Rica

Costa Rica vs Jamaica

Suriname vs Guadeloupe

Discipline
Fair play points would have been used as a tiebreaker if the overall and head-to-head records of teams were tied. These were calculated based on yellow and red cards received in all group matches as follows:
first yellow card: minus 1 point;
indirect red card (second yellow card): minus 3 points;
direct red card: minus 4 points;
yellow card and direct red card: minus 5 points;

Only one of the above deductions was applied to a player in a single match.

Notes

References

External links
 

Group C